The Tumusla River is a river of Bolivia in the Potosí Department (Antonio Quijarro Province, Nor Chichas Province) as well as in the Chuquisaca Department (Nor Cinti Province and Sud Cinti Province). It gets waters from the Los Frailes and Chichas mountain ranges. Upstream the river is named Yura and Toropalca. Cotagaita, a right affluent, is its most important tributary.

Tumusla River flows towards the Pillku Mayu while the river successively receives the names Camblaya (at the confluence with San Juan del Oro River) and Pilaya. The Pilaya River is a right tributary of Pillku Mayu.

See also
 Inka Wasi River
 Jatun Mayu
 List of rivers of Bolivia

References

Sources
 Rand McNally, The New International Atlas, 1993.

Rivers of Chuquisaca Department
Rivers of Potosí Department